The 1916 United States presidential election in Maine took place on November 7, 1916, as part of the 1916 United States presidential election, which was held throughout all the contemporary 48 states. Voters chose six representatives, or electors to the Electoral College, who voted for president and vice president. 

Maine was won by the Republican nominee, U.S. Supreme Court Justice Charles Evans Hughes of New York, and his running mate Senator Charles W. Fairbanks of Indiana. They defeated Democratic nominees, incumbent Democratic President Woodrow Wilson and Vice President Thomas R. Marshall. 

Hughes won Maine by a narrow margin of 4.02%. Nevertheless, Wilson won the election nationally by a narrow margin of 23 electoral votes.

Results

Results by county

See also
 United States presidential elections in Maine

References

Maine
1916
1916 Maine elections